Michael Watson is a Bermudian Olympic middle-distance runner. He represented his country in the men's 1500 meters and the men's 800 meters at the 1988 Summer Olympics. His time was a 1:50.16 in the 800, and a 3:46.49 in the 1500 heats.

References 

1958 births
Living people
Bermudian male middle-distance runners
Olympic athletes of Bermuda
Athletes (track and field) at the 1978 Commonwealth Games
Commonwealth Games competitors for Bermuda
Athletes (track and field) at the 1975 Pan American Games
Athletes (track and field) at the 1979 Pan American Games
Athletes (track and field) at the 1987 Pan American Games
Athletes (track and field) at the 1991 Pan American Games
Pan American Games competitors for Bermuda
Athletes (track and field) at the 1988 Summer Olympics